Tulobuterol (INN) is a long-acting beta2-adrenergic receptor agonist, marketed in Japan as a transdermal patch under the name Hokunalin tape (ホクナリンテープ).

Currently, it is only legal in 7 countries: Japan, Germany, China, South Korea, Bangladesh, Pakistan, and Venezuela. It is available in India also.

References 

Beta-adrenergic agonists
Phenylethanolamines
Chlorobenzenes